Puntius kamalika is a species of cyprinid fish in the genus Puntius. It is found in Sri Lanka.

The fish is named in honor of Kamalika “Kami” Abeyaratne (1934-2004), a Sri Lankan pediatrician who became an AIDS activist after she contracted the disease HIV through a contaminated blood transfusion given to her following a near-fatal traffic accident.

References 

Puntius
Taxa named by Anjana Silva
Taxa named by Kalana Maduwage
Taxa named by Rohan Pethiyagoda
Fish described in 2008